Blei is a German surname meaning "lead". Notable people with the surname include:

David Blei, American computer scientist
Franz Blei (1871–1942), Austrian writer and literary critic
Norbert Blei (1935–2013), American writer

See also
Bley
Blay (surname)